The 2019 season was Urawa Red Diamonds's 19th consecutive season in J1 League, after finishing 5th in the 2018 J1 League. The club also competed in the Emperor's Cup, J.League Cup, Japanese Super Cup and AFC Champions League. They reached the final of the latter competition, losing to Al Hilal of Saudi Arabia by a 0–3 aggregate score.

Squad 
As of 16 January 2019.

Competitions

Super Cup

J1 League

League table

Results

J. League Cup

Emperor's Cup

AFC Champions League

Group standings

Results

Round of 16

Quarter-finals

3–3 on aggregate. Urawa Red Diamonds won on away goals.

Semi-finals

Urawa Red Diamonds won 3–0 on aggregate.

Final

References 

Urawa Red Diamonds
Urawa Red Diamonds seasons